Hurry is a 2001 EP released by Tin Foil Phoenix as Sonic Bloom.

The EP was nominated for a 2002 Western Canadian Music Award for Outstanding Rock Recording.

Critical acclaim
"Hurry was a distinctive, stylish concoction of funky hip-hop, swaggering metal and anthemic modern rock, topped with Michael Zirk's hyperintelligent, stream-of-pop-culture-consciousness neo-beat poetry." -- Darryl Sterdan, Winnipeg Sun, September 10, 2004.

2001 EPs
Tin Foil Phoenix albums